Edward Cyril "Ted" Malone (born July 17, 1937) is a retired Saskatchewan lawyer,  politician and judge. He represented Regina Lakeview in the Legislative Assembly of Saskatchewan from 1973 to 1978 and was leader of the Liberal Party of Saskatchewan from 1976 to 1981.

He was born in Regina, Saskatchewan in 1937, the son of Justin Cyril Malone and Marion Grassick who was the daughter of James Grassick, a Regina MLA and mayor. Malone studied law at the University of Saskatchewan and went on to work for the federal and provincial Liberal parties. He was elected as Liberal Party leader in 1976 after a bitter campaign against Anthony Merchant that divided and weakened the party. The Liberals failed to elect any members in the 1978 provincial election.

Malone was named to the Court of Queen's Bench at Regina in 1981.

External links 
 Entry from the Encyclopedia of Saskatchewan

1937 births
Living people
Judges in Saskatchewan
Politicians from Regina, Saskatchewan
Saskatchewan Liberal Party MLAs
Leaders of the Saskatchewan Liberal Party